Ruth McPherson is a Canadian lipidologist researching in the field of cardiovascular genetics and preventive cardiology.

Education 
McPherson graduated from the University of Toronto in 1984 and received her MD from the same university. Her special training was in internal medicine and endocrinology. She received her PhD from the University of London.

Academia 
She was a faculty at the University of Toronto and McGill University prior to joining the University of Ottawa Heart Institute in 1992. She is currently a tenured faculty in the Department of Medicine and Biochemistry at the University of Ottawa.

McPherson is also an Associate Editor of Arteriosclerosis, Thrombosis, and Vascular Biology and is a member on the Editorial Boards of the Canadian Journal of Cardiology, Journal of Lipid Research, and Circulation: Cardiovascular Genetics.

Research 
She is the director of the Lipid Clinic, Ruddy Canadian Cardiovascular Genetics Centre and Atherogenomics Laboratory at the University of Ottawa Heart Institute. McPherson had led the discovery of the 9p21 genetic risk factor for cardio-vascular disease.

Honours 
In 2014 she was elected as a fellow of the Royal Society of Canada.

References 

Living people
Year of birth missing (living people)
Fellows of the Royal Society of Canada